The 3rd Islamic Solidarity Games was an international sporting event held in Palembang, Indonesia from 22 September to 1 October 2013. The 2009 event, originally scheduled to take place in Iran, and later re-scheduled for April 2010, was cancelled after a dispute arose between Iran and the Arab countries.

Host selection
Indonesia was announced as the host for the Games on April 2011 with Pekanbaru, Riau, as the host city. The Games were then relocated to Jakarta citing lack of standard in some venues combined with a corruption case involving Governor of Riau, Rusli Zainal. Palembang was finally selected as the host city and the Games were delayed about three months from the original time frame in June.

Venues

Participating nations
There are 57 nations participating in 2013 Islamic Solidarity Games.

Sports

Schedule

Medal table

Sports bikini controversy 

The Games faced a controversy over female athletes competing in sports bikinis. Some participating nations demanded that all sportswomen competing in the athletics, beach volleyball and swimming events wear body-covering sporting outfits instead of the usual, functional and official sports bikinis regulated by international rules. In some countries of the Muslim world, sporting suits for women called burqini, which cover the whole body except the face, the hands and the feet, are in use in accordance with Islamic culture. Furthermore, some countries asked the organizers to run the male and female events on separate days. Both regulations were applied in the first edition of the Games held in Saudi Arabia in 2005.

The organizing committee refused to fully comply with the demands stating that only the countries ruled by Islamic governments among the 44 participants with Muslim population opposed the two-piece sporting outfits standardized in international sports dress code. The organizers ruled that the use of sports bikinis is set optional so that sportswomen may wear religious-based outfits.

References

External links
 Official website

 
Islamic Solidarity Games
Islamic Solidarity Games
2013 in Indonesian sport
Solidarity Games
Multi-sport events in Indonesia
International sports competitions hosted by Indonesia